Rüdiger von Bergheim (c.1175 – 14 April 1258) was Bishop of Chiemsee from 1216 to 1233 and Bishop of Passau from 1233 to 1250.

Biography
Rüdiger came from the Salzburg ministerial of the Bergheimer. Since 1198 he was the canon of Salzburg; For 1208 to 1211 he was a pastor of Salzburghofen, until 1215 as a provost of the Augustine Monastery Zell am See and starting from 1215 as a canon of Passau. In 1216 he was appointed the first bishop of the newly founded Diocese of Chiemsee, which was a suffragan bishop of Salzburg. The episcopal ordination took place at Chiemsee by the Salzburg bishop Eberhard von Regensberg.

After the resignation of Bishop Gebhard von Plain, the Passau Bishopric was vacant for a year because the Passau cathedral chapter could not agree on any candidate, Pope Gregory IX then appointed Rüdiger von Bergheim on 27 June 1233 to Passau.

It is not known whether Rüdiger was able to reduce the debt assumed by his predecessor. Soon he fell into conflict with the Kurie, as he stood in the political disputes on the side of the Staufer. From 1234 to 1235 he supported Emperor Frederick II in the struggle against his son Henry and from 1236 to 1239 against Duke Frederick II "the warring" of Austria. That is why he was excommunicated in 1240 by the papal legate Albert Behaim, who was a declared opponent of Frederick II. In the following, the diocese had to accept the loss of Vilshofen as well as the Ortenburg fiefs. The Bavarian Duke Otto II "the illustrious" took the opportunity and undertook a foray into the Passau region. After the imperial party collapsed in the southeast of the Reich in 1245, Rüdiger von Bergheim achieved the abolition of excommunication. After the extinction of the Babenbergs in 1246, whose efforts had always been rejected by the Diocese of Passau, he endeavored to expand his position as a sovereign.

Rüdiger von Bergheim was probably deposed in 1248, probably on the initiative of Behaim. In his place the Silesian Duke Konrad II was elected, but the Kurie failed to confirm in early 1249. In the same year Pope Innocent IV repeated the excommunication of Rüdiger von Bergheim and demanded his resignation. Since Rüdiger was not ready to take this step, he was excommunicated once more by the papal legate, Petrus de Collemedio, Cardinal Bishop of Albano, on 17 February 1250, and deposed for the second time. On 11 March 1250 Pope Innocent IV confirmed this procedure. Subsequently, Rüdiger von Bergheim was expelled from his bishopric. His place of death is not known.

References

1170s births
Roman Catholic bishops of Passau
Year of birth uncertain
1258 deaths
13th-century Roman Catholic bishops in Bavaria